Marline Yan (born January 9, 1993 in St. Thomas, Ontario, Canada) is a Canadian actress and singer.  Her most prominent appearance is in Canadian television series How To Be Indie.

Career
Yan started acting and singing at ten years of age in shows from local theatre companies. In her first year of high school at John Paul II Catholic Secondary School, in London, Ontario, she was cast as the leading role in a production of Romeo and Juliet. At the age fourteen, she was first signed on to an agency and a year later was cast for the role of Abigail, a Filipino-Canadian girl who is also Indie's best friend in the YTV series How To Be Indie. Later that year, she appeared as Sophia in the successful Family Channel series Connor Undercover.

In 2010, Yan was cast in a minor two-episode role for Wingin' It, a children's series which also starred her How to Be Indie co-star Dylan Everett. She most recently completed a television film titled Made... The Movie and was cast for an upcoming film Trigger . Subsequently, she returned for a second season of How To Be Indie, which premiered in fall 2010.

Filmography

Film and television

References

External links

Living people
1993 births
Canadian child actresses
Canadian actresses of Cambodian descent
Canadian actresses of Chinese descent
Canadian actresses of Indian descent
Canadian actresses of Vietnamese descent
Canadian people of Thai descent
Canadian television actresses
People from St. Thomas, Ontario